Alessandro Turchetta (born 26 March 1982) is an Italian football striker. Currently playing for F.C. Rondinelle Latina S.S.D.

External links
Alessandro Turchetta's football plus profile

1982 births
Living people
Italian footballers
Serie B players
Serie C players
ACF Fiorentina players
L.R. Vicenza players
Frosinone Calcio players
Association football forwards
A.S.D. Victor San Marino players
A.S. Gubbio 1910 players
F.C. Grosseto S.S.D. players
Carrarese Calcio players